The IAAF World Challenge Dakar is an annual one-day track and field competition at the Stade Leopold Senghor in Dakar, Senegal as part of the IAAF World Challenge Meetings. It was first organized in 2003 as the Meeting International d'Athletisme de la Ville de Dakar. From 2006 to 2009 the IAAF classified it among IAAF Grand Prix meetings, and it was known as the Meeting Grand Prix IAAF de Dakar as a result.

Meet records

Men

Women

References

Annual track and field meetings
IAAF World Challenge
Recurring sporting events established in 2003
Sports competitions in Dakar
IAAF Grand Prix
Athletics competitions in Senegal